Hovea cymbiformis is a species of flowering plant in the family Fabaceae and is endemic to New South Wales. It is a shrub with foliage covered with brownish to grey hairs, narrowly elliptic leaves with stipules at the base, and mauve and yellowish-green, pea-like flowers.

Description

Taxonomy and naming
Hovea cymbiformis was first formally described in 2001 by Ian R. Thompson in Australian Systematic Botany from specimens collected near Attunga in 1997.The specific epithet (cymbiformis) means "boat-shaped".

Distribution and habitat
This species of pea grows in woodland on soil derived from serpentinite, from near Barraba to near Chaffey Dam in north-eastern New South Wales.

References

cymbiformis
Flora of New South Wales
Fabales of Australia
Plants described in 2001